Thomas Read may refer to:

Thomas Read (naval officer) (1740–1788), officer of the Pennsylvania Navy during the American Revolutionary War
Thomas Buchanan Read (1822–1872), American poet and portrait painter
Thomas Read (politician) (1881–1962), American politician in Michigan
Thomas L. Read, American composer, music pedagogist, conductor en violinist
Bert Read (Thomas Herbert Read), English footballer

See also
Thomas Reed (disambiguation)
Thomas Reid (disambiguation)